Sipoo is a municipality of Finland. It is part of the Helsinki metropolitan area. The municipality has a population of 
which 
is water. The population density is
. Another significant urban area is Söderkulla, located in the southern part of the municipality.

The coat of arms of the municipality refers to the origin story of the settlement, according to which the ancestors of Sipoo are said to have arrived in the region on a viking ship, the bow of which was decorated with a head of wolf; accordingly, locals have even been called the “wolves of Sipoo”. The wave lined fess of the coat of arms refers to the Sipoo River.

Geography 

It is the eastern neighbour of Helsinki and western neighbour of Porvoo, located in the Uusimaa region. Other neighboring municipalities are Vantaa, Kerava, Tuusula, Järvenpää, Mäntsälä and Pornainen. There are two important road connections in the direction of Helsinki from Sipoo: Highway 7, known as the Porvoo Highway (part of E18), and Road 170, which is known as the Itäväylä on the Helsinki side.

The once almost completely Swedish-speaking municipality is bilingual since 1953, a majority being Finnish speakers, due to migration from other parts of Finland since 2003.

On June 26, 2006, the Sipoo town council decided on a strategy to triple the municipality's population over the next 25 years. The decision was made after Helsinki announced plans to annex a part of the municipality in order to continue to build high-end urbanizations by the coastline (and thus high-tax revenue producing). The Finnish Council of State voted in favor of the annexation on June 28, 2007, with votes 8 to 4. Sipoo appealed to the Supreme Administrative Court, but the court upheld the decision of the Council of State and the annexation took place on January 1, 2009.
As Helsinki did not directly border Sipoo at any point, the city of Vantaa ceded the area lain between Helsinki and Sipoo to Helsinki in the process.

Politics
Results of the 2019 Finnish parliamentary election in Sipoo:

Swedish People's Party   25.4%
National Coalition Party   23.8%
Finns Party   12.5%
Social Democratic Party   10.8%
Green League   9.8%
Movement Now   5.3%
Centre Party   4.1%
Left Alliance   2.9%
Christian Democrats   2.3%
Other parties   3.1%

Notable people
 Hjallis Harkimo (born 1953), businessman and politician
 Elina Salo (born 1936), actress
 Nasty Suicide (born 1963), guitarist for Hanoi Rocks
 Ernst Tandefelt (1876–1948), Swedo-Finnish nobleman
 Joona Toivio (born 1988), professional association football player
 Artturi Ilmari Virtanen (1895–1973), Nobel laureate
 Mikael Ylöstalo (1963), Olympian hurdler

In media
Sipoo is featured in Elisa Viihde network's black comedy television series Duke of Sipoo, starring a corrupted Sipolian businessman Pasi Kovalainen, played by Kari Hietalahti.

Twin towns 
 Aurskog-Høland, Norway
 Frederikssund, Denmark
 Kumla, Sweden
 Kuusalu, Estonia

See also 
 Östersundom
 Pornainen
 Porvoo
 Sibbesborg
 Sipoonkorpi National Park
 Temple of Lemminkäinen

References

External links

Municipality of Sipoo – Official website
Pictures
Map of Sipoo

 
Greater Helsinki
Municipalities of Eastern Uusimaa